Vittorio Mangano (18 August 1940 – 23 July 2000) was a member of the Sicilian Mafia or Cosa Nostra. He was well known as the stable keeper at the villa of Silvio Berlusconi in Arcore in the 1970s and as such Mangano is known as "lo stalliere di Arcore" (the stable keeper of Arcore). Berlusconi later became Prime Minister of Italy.

Revelations during Maxi Trial in Palermo 

During the Maxi Trial in the mid-1980s the Mafia turncoats (pentiti), Tommaso Buscetta and Salvatore Contorno, said Mangano was a "uomo d'onore" (man of honour) of Cosa Nostra and a member of the Porta Nuova family that was headed by Pippo Calò. Buscetta himself was a member of this family.

Hired to work in Arcore at Berlusconi's villa 

From 1973 to 1975 Mangano was hired as stable keeper at the Villa San Martino owned by Silvio Berlusconi in Arcore, a small town near Milan. Mangano's real job is alleged to have been to deter kidnappers from targeting the tycoon's children. It was Berlusconi's right-hand man Marcello Dell'Utri who advised to take Mangano for the job. Mangano took care of the Villa's security and sometimes took Berlusconi's children to school.

According to pentito Antonino Giuffrè, Mangano served as a go between for the Mafia boss Stefano Bontade: "When Vittorio Mangano got the job in the Arcore villa, boss Stefano Bontade and some of his close aides used to meet Berlusconi using visits to Mangano as an excuse." Giuffrè told the Palermo court that despite the prime minister's assertions to the contrary, Mangano's Mafia identity was known when he was hired at the villa.

Mangano's criminal record  

Berlusconi kept Mangano as an employee despite his criminal record dating back to the 1960s. He never dismissed him even when, during his time as employee in the Villa, he was imprisoned because of convictions, and suspected of arranging the kidnapping of a friend of Berlusconi. Mangano left spontaneously in late 1975, concerned about Berlusconi's reputation, when many newspapers started making a scandal about his stay at Arcore. Berlusconi later stated that he was absolutely unaware of who Mangano really was when he hired him.

Public prosecutor Paolo Borsellino named Mangano in his last interview on May 19, 1992, with the reporters Jean Pierre Moscardo and Fabrizio Calvi. Borsellino spoke about the relations and connections of the Mafia with business and politics. According to Borsellino, Mangano was the link between the Sicilian Mafia and its interests in Northern Italy. Borsellino was killed two months after this interview by a car bomb in Via D'Amelio.

The pentito Salvatore Cancemi disclosed that Berlusconi's company Fininvest, through Marcello Dell'Utri and Mangano, had paid Cosa Nostra 200 million lire (100 000 euro) annually. The alleged contacts, according to Cancemi, were to lead to legislation favourable to Cosa Nostra, in particular the harsh article 41-bis prison regime. The underlying premise was that Cosa Nostra would support Berlusconi's Forza Italia party in return for political favours.

Murder of Giuseppe Pecoraro and Giovambattista Romano

Mangano was sentenced to life imprisonment on July 19, 2000 for the murder of Giuseppe Pecoraro and Giovambattista Romano in January 1995. Moreover, he was suspected to be responsible for the kidnapping of Luigi D'Angerio after a dinner in the Silvio Berlusconi's villa on December 7, 1974.

Death in prison 

Mangano died a few days after the verdict on July 23, 2000 in jail. He had been imprisoned five years before because of other crimes (drug trade, extortion). He died of a cancer. The epigraph of his tombstone is «rifiutò di barattare la sua dignità con la libertà» (he refused to barter his dignity for freedom).

During an interview on April 8, 2008, Marcello Dell'Utri described Mangano as a great man who went to prison because he refused to say false things against Berlusconi. The following day, April 9, during a show on television channel La7 Berlusconi supported that declaration by saying "Marcello Dell'Utri is right: Mangano was a hero, because he never said anything about me".

Arrest of Cinzia Mangano 

On September 24, 2013, Vittorio Mangano's daughter and  son-in-law, Cinzia Mangano and Enrico Di Grusa, were arrested by Italian police forces during a round-up within a Mafia probe into money laundering.

See also

References

 Travaglio, Marco & Elio Veltri (2001). L'odore dei soldi. Origini e misteri delle fortune di Silvio Berlusconi, Rome: Editori Riuniti

External links
 Relationship between Mangano and Dell'Utri (italian sentences)
 Borsellino's last interview (italian on RaiNews24)
 Ergastolo a Vittorio Mangano, La Repubblica, July 17, 2000.
 Muore Mangano, La Repubblica, July 23, 2000.
 , RadioDue, April 9, 2008.

1940 births
2000 deaths
Gangsters from Palermo
Italian crime bosses